is a 2011 Japanese drama film directed by Hiroshi Nishitani. It is the sequel to the film Amalfi: Rewards of the Goddess and the TV series The Diplomat Kosaku Kuroda.

Cast
 Yūji Oda as Kosaku Kuroda
 Meisa Kuroki as Yuka Shindo
 Hideaki Itō as Makoto Kotari
 Erika Toda as Kanae Adachi
 Masaharu Fukuyama as Saeki Shogo
 Shōsuke Tanihara as Naoki Kawashima
 Takeshi Kaga as Yosuke Ando
 Isao Natsuyagi as Seijuro Murakami

References

External links
 

2011 films
2011 drama films
Japanese drama films
Japanese sequel films
Japanese television films
2010s Japanese films
2010s Japanese-language films
Films directed by Hiroshi Nishitani
Films produced by Kazutoshi Wadakura
Toho films